Adobe Fonts (formerly Typekit) is an online service that provides its subscribers with access to its font library, under a single licensing agreement. The fonts may be used directly on websites, or synced via Adobe Creative Cloud to applications on the subscriber's computers.

Adobe Fonts was launched as Typekit in November 2009 by Small Batch, Inc., a company run by creators of the Google Analytics service. In October 2011, the service was acquired by Adobe. On 15 October 2018, Typekit changed its name to Adobe Fonts.

See also 
 Adobe Font Folio
 Adobe Originals
 Adobe Type

References

External links
 

Adobe Inc.
Digital typography
Web design